Mulberry River may refer to any of several rivers:

Mulberry River (Arkansas) in Arkansas
Mulberry River (Georgia) in Georgia (U.S.)
Mulberry Fork of the Black Warrior River in Alabama

See also 
 Mulberry (disambiguation)
 Mulberry Creek (disambiguation)
 Mulberry Fork River (disambiguation)
 Mulberry River Bridge (disambiguation)